The International Conference on X-Ray Microscopy (XRM) is a biennial international conference on X-ray imaging. The scope includes a range of topics in X-ray imaging, both in the soft and hard X-ray spectrum. Imaging by synchrotron light sources is the dominant topic, but small scale laboratory imaging is also included in many talks and posters. A number of subtopics are covered, including but not limited to X-ray microtomography, Phase-contrast X-ray imaging, Ptychography, and X-ray optics. The conference is typically five days long and held in summer. The conference is organized by an international committee and a local host organization. This local host is in most cases a synchrotron facility or an institute closely connected to a synchrotron. The host of the conference is decided two conferences in advance with a majority vote by all conference attendees. For example, the 14th XRM (2018) was decided during the 12th XRM (2014).

History

The initiators of XRM were the German physicist Günter Schmahl and the Hungarian-American physicist Janos Kirz. Schmahl hosted the first conference in Göttingen in 1983.

XRM was for several years triennial, but has been biennial since 2008.

The 2020 installment of XRM in Taiwan was postponed two years due to the COVID-19 pandemic.

The Werner Meyer-Ilse Memorial Award
Werner Meyer-Ilse was the chair of the International Program Committee for XRM99, but passed away in a car accident days before the conference. In his memory XRM hands out the Werner Meyer-Ilse Memorial Award to "young scientists for exceptional contributions to the advancement of X-ray microscopy".

Previous Recipients

 1999: Daniel Weiss and Jianwei Miao 
 2002: Michael Feser
 2005: Weilun Chao
 2008: Anne Sakdinawat and Pierre Thibault
 2010: Christian Holzner 
 2012: Irene Zanette and Stephan Werner
 2014: Kevin Mader
 2016: Junjing Deng and Matias Kagias
 2018: Claire Donnelly and Marie-Christine Zdora
 2020: Jumpei Yamada (awarded 2022)
 2022: Yanqi Luo and Jisoo Kim

List of XRM conference

See also
X-ray microscope
Phase-contrast X-ray imaging
Synchrotron
Ptychography
Günter Schmahl

Notes
 Attendance numbers are taken from their respective proceedings.

References

External links
XRM2005
XRM2010
XRM2016
XRM2018
XRM2022
XRM2024

Physics conferences